According to the Book of Mormon, Samuel the Lamanite is a prophet who lived in the ancient Americas, sent by Jesus Christ around 5 BC to teach and warn the Nephites just before his birth in the Old World. The account is recorded in Helaman 13-16.

Ministry

Samuel is notable in the Book of Mormon as he is a Lamanite prophet. Lamanites generally are described as wicked, and most prophets are Nephites.

After attempting to preach to the people in Zarahemla, and being rejected, he was told by revelation to return and prophesy to the people. He was not allowed into the city. In one of the more iconic stories of the Book of Mormon, he preached on the wall of the city, calling the people to repentance for their sins, prophesying about the impending advent of Jesus Christ in the Old World, and warning of the destruction of the Nephite nation. The people in the city tried to kill him by throwing stones and shooting arrows, but he was protected from harm by divine providence.

In popular media

In 1997, Donny Osmond left his starring role in the tour of Joseph and the Amazing Technicolor Dreamcoat to play the role of Samuel the Lamanite in the Hill Cumorah Pageant.

See also
Book of Helaman (from The Book of Mormon)

References

Further reading

External links
 Audio. BYU Book of Mormon Discussions: Episode 43 "Samuel the Lamanite"

Book of Mormon prophets
Book of Mormon words and phrases